x Infinity, (pronounced Times Infinity) is the fourth studio album by American rapper, spoken word artist and author George Watsky, released on August 19, 2016. The album was recorded at Seahorse Studios in Los Angeles, Grand St. Recording in Brooklyn, and Aqua Vibea in Hadley, Massachusetts.

The album, executive produced by Russell Simmons – who Watsky previously connected with as a guest on Season 6 of Simmons' HBO series Russell Simmons Presents Def Poetry – was produced by Kush Mody and features additional production from Anderson .Paak and drumming by Josh Dun of Twenty One Pilots, among other collaborations. Unlike Watsky's previous album, All You Can Do, which was almost entirely produced by .Paak, the album contains only one song, Midnight Heart, that features production from him. Josh Dun of Twenty One Pilots accompanies Watsky on the drums in Track 13, Midnight Heart.

Background 
On Twitter, Watsky described the album's thesis statement as a message "that embracing our insignificance in the vastness of time & space frees us to be joyful." He stated in another tweet that the album was his first in 2 years.

Release 

The lead single, Stick to Your Guns featuring Julia Nunes, was released on July 1, 2016, as a free download on Watsky's Bandcamp page. A week later, the second single, Tiny Glowing Screens, Pt. 3, was released alongside the announcement of the album.  An accompanying music video was released on YouTube. On August 18, 2016, the day before the album's scheduled release, lyric annotation site Genius premiered the song Don't Be Nice, along with the lyrics for the entire album.  This is not the first time Watsky premiered music right before the album through Genius; a similar promotion was done for the release of Cardboard Castles and All You Can Do.

Reception

x Infinity was met with positive reviews.

Andy Kellman of AllMusic gave the album a three and a half out of five stars, adding that "Ultimately, this is his brightest, most accomplished release yet." SputnikMusic user RedHotRedd gave the album a similar score, saying "It seems as though Watsky really wanted x Infinity to be his best effort, and it most certainly was."

Track listing
Track listing adapted from the iTunes Store, and credits from Genius.

Charts

References

2016 albums
George Watsky albums